Suzanne Casale Melone ( Casale;  born March 1, 1979), better known by her stage name Lil Suzy, is an Italian-Puerto Rican American freestyle/pop singer who was mainly active in the 1990's. Lil Suzy is best known for the singles "Take Me in Your Arms", "Promise Me", and "Can't Get You Out of My Mind".

Early life
Melone was born in Brooklyn, a borough of New York City. While singing cover songs in Manhattan Beach, California at age 5, she was discovered by an agent. She then began performing as an opening act for Thelma Houston and Village People.

Music career

1987–1994: Career beginnings and "Take Me in Your Arms"
At 8 years old, Melone got her first contract with Fever Records, and in 1988 released her first single, "Randy".

At age 12 she joined the label Warlock Records. In November 1991, Melone released her first studio album, Love Can't Wait, which was produced by Tony Garcia. It was preceded by the single "Take Me in Your Arms" which peaked at No. 67 on the Billboard Hot 100. Another single, "Falling in Love", was released in 1992. She was named Billboard magazine's Best New Dance Artist that year, making her the youngest artist ever to receive the honor. 

In early 1994, her second album Back to Dance was released. This album was again produced by Tony Garcia. "Turn the Beat Around" was released in late 1993 as the sole single from the album but was not successful. Due to the limited success of the album, Lil Suzy left Warlock Records and went on to become president of her own record label, Empress Records.

1995–1997: "Promise Me" and later releases
In April 1995, Melone released her third album, Life Goes On, a eurodance release. The album spawned four singles, the first being "Promise Me", which peaked at No. 62 on the Billboard Hot 100.

In 1997, Melone released her fourth studio album, Paradise. The album spawned four singles; Can't Get You Out of My Mind was the most successful of these releases. The album contains a collaboration with singer Crystal Waters on the track "Lost Love Letter". This album also contains a cover of the Netzwerk song, "Memories".

1999–present: Compilation albums, singles, and performances 
In 1999, Melone released The MegaMix, a compilation of old hits and new remixes.

In 2002, Melone released The Greatest Hits, a compilation of her greatest hits re-recorded. In the same year, together with Collage, she released the single "Don't You Want Me", exclusively for the German market. The single is a cover of the song by The Human League.

In 2009, Melone released the single "Dance Tonight".

In 2015 and 2022 she toured in Freestyle Explosion shows.

Personal life
Melone is married to Marc Melone. They have a daughter and two sons. 

In her 20s, between recording and performing music, Melone attended school to become a registered medical assistant. She worked part-time for a OB/GYN for three years. 

On 2 October 2000, she opened a beauty salon in Staten Island, which has since closed.

Discography

Studio albums

Compilation albums

Singles

Video clips

Other songs
 1996 - "Suzanna", with Collage, released on the compilation Metropolitan Freestyle Extravaganza Volume 7.
 1997 - "Runaway", released on the compilation Dance Trip 2000.
 1999 - "He's All I Want for Christmas / Letter to Santa", released on the compilation Freestyle X-Mas.
 1999 - "All I Want ", with Collage, released on the album Chapter II: 1999.
 2002 - "Treat Me Right", originally recorded in 2001, released on the compilation Euro Freestyle Invasion.
 2003 - "I Still Cry", originally recorded in 2002, released on the compilation Euro Freestyle Invasion II.

References

External links
Lil' Suzy's Official Web Site

1979 births
Living people
People from Brooklyn
21st-century American singers
21st-century American women singers
American child singers
American women pop singers
American women singer-songwriters
American freestyle musicians
American musicians of Puerto Rican descent
American people of Italian descent
Child pop musicians
Musicians from Brooklyn
Singer-songwriters from New York (state)